Lady Margaret Boleyn (c. 1454  – 1539) was an Irish noblewoman, the daughter and co-heiress of Thomas Butler, 7th Earl of Ormond. She married Sir William Boleyn and through her eldest son Sir Thomas Boleyn, was the paternal grandmother of Anne Boleyn, second wife of King Henry VIII of England, and great-grandmother of Anne and Henry's daughter, Elizabeth I of England.

Life
She was born at Kilkenny Castle in County Kilkenny, Ireland, the daughter and co-heiress of Thomas Butler, 7th Earl of Ormond and Anne Hankford. Her paternal grandparents were James Butler, 4th Earl of Ormond and Joan de Beauchamp. Her maternal grandparents were Sir Richard Hankford (c. 1397 – 1431) and Anne de Montagu.

She had two sisters: Anne who married Sir James de St Leger, by whom she had issue, and Elizabeth. Anne and Margaret claimed to be co-heiresses of their father and the Earldom of Ormond, but their cousin, Piers Butler, who had physical control of the Irish estates and the backing of the Irish Council, claimed to be the heir through the direct male line. In 1520, the King granted her a pardon for the alienation of Fritwell Manor, Oxfordshire. The issue wasn't resolved until 1528, by which time Margaret's position was good, with the influence of her granddaughter, then betrothed to Henry VIII, and Margaret's son, Thomas Boleyn's, status as King's adviser.

In 1465 Margaret married Sir William Boleyn, with whom she had ten children. Her son, the ambitious courtier Sir Thomas Boleyn, became the first Earl of Wiltshire and by his marriage to Elizabeth Howard, the Duke of Norfolk's daughter, was the father of Anne Boleyn, Queen Consort of England. Thus, Margaret was great-grandmother to Queen Elizabeth I of England.

From around 1519 onward, she was declared by inquisition to have suffered periods of insanity making her incapable of managing her own estates.

She was the last of the Boleyns to live in Hever Castle as it was given to Anne of Cleves in 1540, after Margaret's death. Her lands were claimed by her only surviving grandchild, Mary Boleyn, and her husband, William Stafford.

Issue

Fictional portrayals
Margaret Butler as Grandmother Boleyn appears in the 2002 Philippa Gregory novel The Other Boleyn Girl. She is portrayed as a critical and insubordinate woman who is shrewd and uncaring toward her grandchildren and great-grandchildren. She does seem to inquire about life in the English court. Margaret lived in the Boleyn estate in Hever Castle, and plays a supporting role in the novel.

See also
 Butler dynasty

References

External links
 Butler Family. Accessed 18 December 2007.
 Anne Boleyn and John Shelton Accessed 18 December 2007.

1454 births
1539 deaths
Margaret
Margaret
Daughters of Irish earls
Wives of knights
Women of the Tudor period
16th-century Irish people
15th-century Irish people
15th-century Irish women
16th-century Irish women